From 1836 to 1845, the Republic of Texas elected its own presidents. In 1845, it was admitted to the United States as the state of Texas, and has been a participant in every presidential election since, except for 1864 and 1868. Texas did not participate in these due to its secession from the United States to join the Confederate States of America on February 1, 1861, and its status as an unreconstructed state in 1868 following the American Civil War.

Texas gubernatorial elections, as well as other state office races, are held every four years on the nationwide Election Day, which is the Tuesday after the first Monday in November. They are held on years that are even-numbered, but not multiples of four, also known as a midterm, so they do not coincide with the presidential elections. Texas Senate elections are held every four years on the same date as gubernatorial elections. Texas House elections are held every two years on Election Day. 

For about a hundred years, from after Reconstruction until the 1990s, the Democratic Party dominated Texas politics, making part of the Solid South. In a reversal of alignments, since the late 1960s, the Republican Party has grown more prominent. By the 1990s, it became the state's dominant political party and remains so to this day, as Democrats have not won a statewide race since the 1994 Lieutenant gubernatorial election. Texas is a majority Republican state with Republicans controlling every statewide office. Texas Republicans have majorities in the State House and Senate, an entirely Republican Texas Supreme Court, control of both Senate seats in the US Congress. Texas is America's most-populous Republican state. Many commentators had suggested that Texas is trending Democratic since 2016, however, Republicans have continued to win every statewide office, albeit by reduced margins, as it was the third-closest state Republicans won in 2020.  

Texas was the first state to elect a woman governor, simultaneous to Wyoming in 1924 with the election of Miriam A. Ferguson.

Voting System
To reduce the amount of time required to fill electoral vacancies, in special elections Texas dispenses with party primaries and instead uses a jungle primary system. Candidates of all parties (or no party) appear on the same ballot; if no single one of them receives 50 percent plus 1 vote, the two highest vote-getters also advance to a runoff irrespective of party affiliation.

Elections

Gubernatorial
2022 Texas gubernatorial election
2018 Texas gubernatorial election
2014 Texas gubernatorial election
2010 Texas gubernatorial election
2006 Texas gubernatorial election

Senatorial
2020 United States Senate election in Texas
2018 United States Senate election in Texas
2014 United States Senate election in Texas
2012 United States Senate election in Texas

See also
 United States presidential elections in Texas
 Political party strength in Texas
 Women's suffrage in Texas

Further reading

References

External links
Elections Division at the Texas Secretary of State official website

 
 
  (State affiliate of the U.S. League of Women Voters)
 Digital Public Library of America. Assorted materials related to Texas elections
 

 
Government of Texas
Political events in Texas